Chouzy-sur-Cisse (literally Chouzy on Cisse), commonly known as Chouzy, is a former commune in the Loir-et-Cher department, Central France. On January 1, 2017, it was merged into the new commune Valloire-sur-Cisse.

Population

See also
Communes of the Loir-et-Cher department

References

Former communes of Loir-et-Cher